The name Hilary has been used for ten tropical cyclones in the Eastern Pacific Ocean.
Tropical Depression Hilary (1967)
Hurricane Hilary (1971)
Tropical Storm Hilary (1975)
Hurricane Hilary (1981)
Hurricane Hilary (1987)
Hurricane Hilary (1993)
Hurricane Hilary (1999)
Hurricane Hilary (2005) – formed near Mexico and moved parallel to it
Hurricane Hilary (2011)
Hurricane Hilary (2017)

Pacific hurricane set index articles